Michigan's 7th congressional district is a United States congressional district in Southern Michigan and portions of Central Michigan. From 2004 to 2013 it consisted of all of Branch, Eaton, Hillsdale, Jackson, and Lenawee counties, and included most of Calhoun and a large portion of western and northern Washtenaw counties. The current district, which was created in 2022, is centered around Lansing, Michigan's state capital, and includes all of Clinton, Shiawassee, Ingham, and Livingston counties, as well as portions of Eaton and Oakland counties.

The district is currently represented by Democrat Elissa Slotkin, who previously represented the old 8th district. The previous incarnation of this district was represented by Republican Tim Walberg, who now represents the state's 5th congressional district.

Major cities
Charlotte
Howell
Lansing
Mason
Owosso
St. Johns
South Lyon

Voting

Early history
The 7th congressional district was formed in 1872 covering the Thumb of Michigan.  It had Tuscola, Huron, Sanilac, Lapeer, St. Clair and Macomb Counties.  In 1882 Tuscola County was removed from the district but everything else remained the same.  In 1892 Grosse Point and Hamtramck Townships, the latter one today mainly within the city boundaries of Detroit were moved into the 7th district.

In 1912 Tuscola county was put back in the 7th district, but it may have lost its Wayne County areas.  It was definitely deprived of these areas by 1932.

In 1964 the 7th district experienced its most drastic redistricting yet.  Only Lapeer County was retained from the old district while Genesee County was added.  In 1972 the district was redrawn again, losing Lapeer County as well as a few outlying parts of Genesee County.  In 1982 most of Lapeer county was put back in the 7th district.  The northern tier of townships in Genesee County were moved to the 8th district.  Burns Township in Shiawasee County and all the northern tier of townships in Oakland County with the exception of Brandon Township were also put in the district.

After 1992 this old 7th district constituted a large part of the new 9th district.

Predecessors to the 1992 district
The current 7th has no connection with the pre-1992 seventh congressional district. If populations and not just areas are considered, it is primarily an heir of the previous 3rd district.  Most of the area came from the old 2nd district, and some of John Dingell's old 16th district was also included.

All of Eaton and Calhoun Counties were preserved from the 3rd to the 7th district.  Half of the area of Barry County that had been in the old 3rd was retained.  From the old 4th was drawn most of Branch County.  The rest of Branch County and Hillsdale County, the south-western portion of Washtenaw County and western Lenawee County and most of Jackson County were taken from the old 2nd district.  Even though most of the area of the old second was put in the new 7th, most of its population was moved into the 13th, From Ann Arbor to Plymouth, Livonia and Northville.  The portion of Lenawee County that had been in the 16th was absorbed, and a small part of the Washtenaw County area of the 15th district and the part of the old 6th that had been in Jackson County.  Thus the new 7th district incorporated areas from six old districts.

The 2002 redistricting is best seen as a shift from the 3rd district to the 2nd district legacy.  With the loss of its quadrant in Barry County and a small section of Calhoun County the district lost affinity to the 3rd of yore.  It took back the portion of Washtenaw County that had been lost to the 8th district, and shed the part of Washtenaw County that had come from the old 15th district.  Although none of Wayne County was included in the new district, it did have Salem Township which not only borders Wayne County but is largely in a Wayne County-headquartered school district.

In the 2012 redistricting the district gained Monroe County as well as the portion of Washtenaw County around Saline.

List of representatives

Recent election results

2012

2014

2016

2018

2020

2022

Historical district boundaries

See also
Michigan's congressional districts
List of United States congressional districts

Notes

References
 Govtrack.us for the 7th District - Lists current Senators and representative, and map showing district outline
 The Political graveyard: U.S. Representatives from Michigan, 1807-2003
 U.S. Representatives 1837-2003, Michigan Manual 2003-2004

 Congressional Biographical Directory of the United States 1774–present

07
Constituencies established in 1873
1873 establishments in Michigan